Louis Barker (26 May 1876 – 23 May 1963) was an Australian rules footballer who played for the Fitzroy Football Club in the Victorian Football League (VFL).

Sources

Holmesby, Russell & Main, Jim (2009). The Encyclopedia of AFL Footballers. 8th ed. Melbourne: Bas Publishing.

1876 births
Australian rules footballers from Melbourne
Australian Rules footballers: place kick exponents
Fitzroy Football Club players
Fitzroy Football Club Premiership players
Australian military personnel of World War I
1963 deaths
One-time VFL/AFL Premiership players
Military personnel from Melbourne